The Museum of International Folk Art is a state-run institution in Santa Fe, New Mexico, United States. It is one of many cultural institutions operated by the New Mexico Department of Cultural Affairs.

History 
The museum was founded by Florence Dibell Bartlett and opened to the public in 1953 and has gained national and international recognition as the home to the world’s largest collection of international folk art. The collection of more than 135,000 artifacts forms the basis for exhibitions in four distinct wings: Bartlett, Girard, Hispanic Heritage, and Neutrogena. The original building, a gift to the state from Bartlett, was designed by famed New Mexico architect John Gaw Meem.

The Girard Wing, with its popular exhibition, Multiple Visions: A Common Bond, showcases folk art, popular art, toys and textiles from more than 100 nations. The exhibition is unique in that it was designed by the donor, Alexander Girard, a leading architect and designer. The collection includes toys and dolls, costumes, masks, textiles of all kinds, religious folk art, paintings, beadwork, and more. More than a million visitors have passed through the doors into the special world of Girard since the exhibition opened in 1982. Popular with children and the young at heart, the exhibit attracts visitors back into the museum to find an old favorite, or discover a new treasure in the gallery. Multiple Visions: A Common Bond displays approximately 10% of the collection, the exhibit and collection serve as an inspiration and resource for scholars, artists and educators from around the world, from preschool to college level.

The Museum’s Neutrogena Collection — donated by former Neutrogena CEO Lloyd Cotsen in 1995 — comprises more than 2,500 textiles, ceramics and carvings from all over the world. The Hispanic Heritage Wing opened in 1988 and, at that time, was the only designated space for Spanish/Hispanic art in the state.  This wing underwent renovation and reopened in the fall of 2009, continuing its spotlight on Hispanic folk art from New Mexico and beyond.

The Bartlett Wing, named in honor of museum founder Florence Dibell Bartlett, offers rotating exhibitions based on the museum collections and on field studies of specific cultures or art forms. Exhibition in this wing have ranged from Turkish, Tibetan and Swedish traditions to New Deal era art in New Mexico, recycled objects,  mayólica, ¡CARNAVAL! and Dancing Shadows, Epic Tales: Wayang Kulit of Indonesia  and Macedonian Embroidered Dress 

The museum is on Museum Hill in Santa Fe, and is home to the International Folk Art Market| Santa Fe  every July. The Museum of International Folk Art shares Milner Plaza with another state-run institution, the Museum of Indian Arts and Culture/Laboratory of Anthropology.  Adjacent to both of these are the private Wheelwright Museum of the American Indian and Museum of Spanish Colonial Art and the Santa Fe Botanical Garden.

See also
 Mingei International Museum of World Folk Art, California
 Sallie Wagner

Notes

External links
Museum of International Folk Art - official site

Museums in Santa Fe, New Mexico
Art museums established in 1953
Folk art museums and galleries in New Mexico
1953 establishments in New Mexico